The Union of Journalists of Moldova is a non-governmental organisation promoting interests of journalists involved in Moldovan media.

Overview 
The Union of Journalists of Moldova (then Moldovan SSR) was formed in October 1957. The Union has 400 active members. Valeriu Saharneanu has been the head of the Union of Journalists of Moldova since 1997.

The union is a full member of the Association of European Journalists.

See also 
 List of newspapers in Moldova
 Television in Moldova

External links 
 Uniunea Jurnaliştilor din Moldova

International Federation of Journalists
Mass media in Moldova
Journalism organizations in Europe
Trade unions in Moldova
Organizations established in 1957
Journalists' trade unions